Ali Akram Shuvo is a Bangladeshi music director who has composed music for films. He has composed 60 films.

Career
He won the Bachsas Award for Best Music Director in 2012 for film Khodar Pore Ma.

He composed the song "Monta Kere Nili" for 2018 film Panku Jamai.

Filmography

Boba Khuni (2002) (lyrics by Jahanara Bhuiyan)
Bhaier Shotru Bhai (2004)
Amar Praner Priya (2009)
Jiboner Cheye Dami (2009)
Ora Amake Bhalo Hote Dilo Na (2010)
Bhalobaslei Ghor Bandha Jay Na (2010)
Number One Shakib Khan (2010)
Nissash Amar Tumi (2010)
Adorer Jamai (2011)
Boss Number One (2011)
Bhalobasar Rong (2012)
Khodar Pore Ma (2012)
Don Number One (2012)
Full & Final (2013)
Daring Lover (2014)
Hitman (2014)
Antor Jala (2017)
Ohongkar (2017)
Crime Road (2017)
Koto Shopno Koto Asha (2017)

1990s

2000s

2010s

2020s

Year Unknown

References

External links
 

Year of birth missing (living people)
Living people
Bangladeshi film score composers